This is a list of Honorary Fellows of Christ's College, Cambridge. A list of current honorary fellows is published in the Cambridge University Reporter, Special No. 3, 2008.

 Archbishop of Canterbury
 Bernard Bailyn
 John Ball
 Sir Rodric Braithwaite
 Sir David Cannadine
 Sir Anthony Caro
 John Clarke
 Linda Colley
 Sir Jim Cuthbert Smith
 Sir Alan Cottrell
 Sir Michael Edwards
 Sir Martin Evans
 John Gregg
 Yusuf Hamied
 Sir Peter Hirsch
 Anthony R. Hunter
 Hugh Huxley
 Derry Irvine, Baron Irvine of Lairg
 Phillip King
 Richard Luce, Baron Luce
 Michael Richard Lynch
 Sir John Lyons
 Neil McKendrick
 James Meade
 Sir Martin Moore-Bick
 Louis Mountbatten, 1st Earl Mountbatten of Burma
 Sir Robin Nicholson
 Sir Keith Peters
 Sir Hugh Pelham
 Sir Christopher Ricks
 Charles Saumarez Smith
 Simon Schama
 Sir Nicholas Serota
 Quentin Skinner
 Margaret Stanley
 Barry Supple
 Sir Jeffrey Tate
 Andrew Turnbull, Baron Turnbull
 Sir Dillwyn Williams
 Rowan Williams, Baron Williams of Oystermouth
 Oliver Wright
 George Yeo
 Yeo Ning Hong
 Christopher Zeeman

 
Christ's College, Cambridge
Christ's College